Péle, a nickname for Pelegrina Pastorino, (1902 Genova, Italy – 1988 Buenos Aires, Argentina) was a reputable Argentine women's fashion reporter, fashion editor, critics translator, feminist educator,  and a  member of the Florida group; she actively participated in the movement of women's rights during the 1930s and 1940s period.

Career
Pele was born at Palazzo Pastorino, undoubtedly one of the most beautiful examples of the work of the famous Italian Architect Gino Coppede (1866 - 1927) a foremost exponent of 'Art Nouveau', located on Via Bartolomeo Bosco, 57, Genova GE, Italy, the Palazzo was built for the wealthy Pastorino family and is situated in Portoria central Genoa. Later on in her childhood, she arrived in Argentina with her immigrant family at an early age, eventually, once she reached her maturity age, her family sent her back to Italy to finishing school. In Italy, she was educated in fashion, fine arts and letters at "Academia di Belle Arti di Brera" of Milan. Initially, Pele started her career as a fashion model and public relations person for the British company Harrods, representing fashion commercials in portraits promoting women equality and feminist fashion trends, bringing women's trousers to Argentina and taking part in commercials for the cigarette company Primeros "fags for ladies" own by Greek-Argentine businessman Aristotle Onassis.

She married the writer and educator Nicolás Barrios-Lynch.

Journalistic work

 a magazine published since 1931 until 2002. Her work with María Rosa Oliver as a multilingual translator provided editorial content supporting recognition of women in the workplace and equality in society at large. She participated in international feminist engagements from her position as private assistant to famous feminist and Argentine writer Victoria Ocampo.

Humanitarian work

During World War II, Pele took part in humanitarian work in the rescue of women and children exiting Europe by finding them homes in Argentina, Uruguay, and Brazil, as a participant of the International Red Cross and Unesco refugees training assistant program. She was the aunt of famous Argentine actress Malvina Pastorino, Pele was married in Cordoba to the Argentine essayist Nicolás Barrios-Lynch.

References

1902 births
1988 deaths
Argentine women writers
Argentine feminists
Italian emigrants to Argentina